The Power of the Whistler is a 1945 film noir thriller film based on the radio drama The Whistler.  Directed by Lew Landers, the production features Richard Dix. It is the third of Columbia Pictures' eight "Whistler" films produced in the 1940s, seven starring Dix.

Plot
Dix plays an amnesiac who learns about his name and past through the help of amateur fortune teller Jean Lang (Janis Carter).

The fortune teller sees the mysterious-looking man when she is in a restaurant with her sister and the sister's boyfriend. Without meeting him, she predicts that he will be near death twice in the coming day. Outside the restaurant, she saves him from being struck by a car. It is then that he realizes he has no memory of his past.

Charmed by his pleasant, cultured manner, she resolves to help him uncover the mystery of his life. She continues to do so, even as she encounters signs that they may find something scary.

Cast
 Richard Dix as William Everest
 Janis Carter as Jean Lang
 Jeff Donnell as Frances
 Loren Tindall as Charlie Kent
 Tala Birell as Constantina Ivaneska
 John Abbott as Kaspar Andropolous

Reception
Critic Leonard Maltin said of the film, "Third Whistler entry is a little padded but still genuinely eerie."

References

External links
 
 
 
 
 

1945 films
1945 mystery films
American mystery films
American black-and-white films
Columbia Pictures films
Film noir
Films about amnesia
Films based on radio series
Films with screenplays by Aubrey Wisberg
The Whistler films
1940s English-language films
Films directed by Lew Landers
1940s American films